Ligdia adustata, the scorched carpet, is a moth of the family Geometridae.

Etymology
The species Latin name adusta, meaning burnt, refers to the scorched appearance of the wings of these moths.

Description
The wingspan is 25–30 mm. The basic color of the wings is glossy white, creamy white or light brownish. The basal area of the forewings is dark brown and can sometimes be slightly blue-grey. Across the forewings near the outer margin there is a blue-grey and brown wavy band. Hindwings are whitish with wavy pale brown lines on the slightly wavy outer edges. The underside of the wings is suffused with reddish brown.

Larvae are moderately stout, bright green with red dorsal spots, a red lateral blotch on the 1st—2nd abdominals and red marks on claspers; a rare variety is grey-brown. The pupae are red-brown with blackish wings.

Ligdia adustata has two generations per year (bivoltine species). The adults fly in April–May, and later in July–August, but the flight season varies greatly, depending on the location within the distribution range. These moths are active from dusk onwards.

The larvae feed on spindle (Euonymus europaeus, Euonymus verrucosa and on Berberis species. The species overwinters as a pupa.

Distribution
This species can be found in most of Europe and in the Near East.

Habitat
This moth is common in various environments, mainly in shrubs, deciduous forests, thickets, parks and gardens.

References

External links

Lepiforum.de

Abraxini
Moths of Europe
Moths of Asia
Taxa named by Michael Denis
Taxa named by Ignaz Schiffermüller